The 2019–20 Ireland Tri-Nation Series was a cricket tournament that was held in September 2019 in Ireland. It was a tri-nation series that featured Ireland, the Netherlands and Scotland, with all the matches played as Twenty20 Internationals (T20Is). The series was arranged after the planned first edition of the Euro T20 Slam was cancelled. The matches were used by all the teams as part of their preparation for the 2019 ICC Men's T20 World Cup Qualifier tournament. Both Cricket Scotland and the KNCB thanked Cricket Ireland for agreeing to host the tournament, following the cancellation of the Euro T20 Slam.

The fifth match of the series saw Scotland beat the Netherlands by six wickets. The result meant that the Netherlands were knocked out of contention of winning the series. Ireland beat Scotland by one run in the sixth and final match, to win the series. Scotland's George Munsey was named as the player of the series for his batting, which included a century against the Netherlands in the second match.

Squads

Jacob Mulder was ruled out of Ireland's squad due to injury and was replaced by Simi Singh.

Points table

Matches

1st match

2nd match

3rd match

4th match

5th match

6th match

Notes

References

External links
 Series home at ESPN Cricinfo

2019 in Scottish cricket
2019 in Irish cricket
2019 in Dutch cricket
International cricket competitions in 2019–20
Dutch cricket tours abroad
Scottish cricket tours abroad
September 2019 sports events in Europe